Großburgwedel is a village northeast of Hanover, Lower Saxony, Germany. Formerly an independent municipality, it is part of the town Burgwedel since 1974. Großburgwedel is home to the town hall of Burgwedel and other town institutions such as the library, a hospital for the region of Hanover. It also has a grammar school, secondary school, secondary modern school and special needs school, as well as a builder's yard and open air swimming pool.

Church 

In Großburgwedel is the parish of St. Peter, part of the Lutheran state church of Hanover. This supports the church itself and the parish hall as well as the vicarage and the parish gardens in Mitteldorf. In addition Großburgwedel is the seat of the  diocese of Burgdorfer Land, which is responsible for the parishes of Burgdorf and Burgwedel-Langenhagen.

Transport 
Großburgwedel has an autobahn junction (no. 54) on the A 7, that runs past Großburgwedel to the west. Furthermore, the village lies on the railway line from Hanover via Celle and Uelzen to Hamburg. All local trains operated by the Metronom Eisenbahngesellschaft stop at Großburgwedel station. The L 381 and L383 run through Großburgwedel. Between the L383 and L381, L381 and K113 as well as between the K113 and L383, there are ring roads.

Economy 
The headquarters of the chemist's chain Rossmann and the KIND Hearing Aids are located in Großburgwedel. In addition it is home to a branch of the IKEA furniture group.

Well-known personalities 
 Otto Wöhler (b. 1894) was a Wehrmacht general.
 Martin Kind (b 1944), president of Hanover 96 and general manager of KIND Hearing Aids.
 Stefan Heuer (b 1971), writer 
 Bettina Wulff, née Körner (b 1974), wife of Christian Wulff, a former President of Germany
 Bettina Zimmermann (b 1975), German actress 
 Katja Munck (b 1979), German basketball player

References

External links 
 Burgwedel home page

Villages in Lower Saxony